A stereo test may refer to:
In acoustics, a test of the ability to distinguish stereophonic sound
In vision, a test of the ability for stereopsis, see Stereopsis test